Sanchitha Padukone is an Indian actress in Kannada films and Telugu films. She hails from the same village as Bollywood actress Deepika Padukone, and has denied media reports that the two are related.

Filmography

References 

Actresses from Karnataka
Indian film actresses
Actresses in Kannada cinema
Living people
Actresses in Tamil cinema
1988 births
People from Udupi district
Actresses in Telugu cinema
21st-century Indian actresses